September is a 2013 Greek drama film directed by Penny Panayotopoulou. It was screened in the City to City section at the 2013 Toronto International Film Festival.

Cast
 Nikos Diamandis
 Kora Karvouni as Ana
 Youlika Skafida as Charwoman
 Maria Skoula as Sofia
 Christos Stergioglou

References

External links
 

2013 films
2013 drama films
Greek drama films
2010s Greek-language films